Platysilurus is a genus of long-whiskered catfishes native to South America.

Taxonomy 
Platysilurus is classified under the "Calophysus-Pimelodus clade". Within this clade, it is considered a part of the "Pimelodus-group" of Pimelodids, which also includes Pimelodus, Exallodontus, Duopalatinus, Cheirocerus, Iheringichthys, Bergiaria, Bagropsis, Parapimelodus, Platystomatichthys, and Propimelodus.

Species
There are currently three recognized species in this genus:
 Platysilurus malarmo Schultz, 1944
 Platysilurus mucosus (Vaillant, 1880)
 Platysilurus olallae (Orcés-V. (es), 1977)

Distribution 
P. malarmo is distributed in the Lake Maracaibo basin. P. mucosus inhabits the Amazon and Orinoco River basins. P. olallae is found in Ecuador.

Description 
P. malarmo reaches 70 centimetres (28 in) SL. P. mucosus grows to a length of at least 20 cm (7.9 in) SL.

References

Pimelodidae
Fish of South America
Fish of the Amazon basin
Catfish genera
Freshwater fish genera